Wouter Barendrecht (November 5, 1965, The Netherlands – April 5, 2009, Bangkok, Thailand) was a film producer. With Michael J. Werner, Barendrecht was the co-chairman of Fortissimo Films, a company he founded in 1991 in Amsterdam.

Barendrecht worked as a programmer at the International Film Festival Rotterdam and as a press officer for the Berlin International Film Festival. A member of the European Film Academy, he frequently served on the juries of international film festivals.

From 1997 until his death, he was based in Hong Kong and was one of the two people who re-vitalised the Hong Kong Lesbian & Gay Film Festival in 2000.

Filmography
Credits as either executive producer or producer
The Goddess of 1967 (2000)
Tsui Hark's Vampire Hunters (2002)
Bear's Kiss (2002)
Springtime in a Small Town (2002)
Party Monster (2003)
16 Years of Alcohol (2003)
The Tulse Luper Suitcases, Part 1: The Moab Story (2003) 
Last Life in the Universe (2003)
The Tulse Luper Suitcases: Antwerp (2003)
The Tulse Luper Suitcases, Part 3: From Sark to the Finish
Grimm (2003)
P.S. (2004)
Mysterious Skin (2004)
The Night Listener (2006)
Invisible Waves (2006)
When the Road Bends… Tales of a Gypsy Caravan (2006) 
Shortbus (2006)
Syndromes and a Century (2006)
I Don't Want to Sleep Alone (2006)
Waiter (2006)
Getting Home (2007)
The Home Song Stories (2007)
Ploy (2007)
Pleasure Factory (2007)
Country Wedding (2008)
Life During Wartime (2008)
Black Oasis (2008)

References

External links
Wouter Barendrecht: 1965 – 2009
Fortissimo Films partners

Dutch film producers
Mass media people from Amsterdam
1965 births
2009 deaths